The Other One is the third solo album by American musician and former Fleetwood Mac guitarist Bob Welch. The track "Future Games" was first released on the Fleetwood Mac album of the same name in 1971. Members of Welch's backing band also make songwriting contributions here though the majority of tracks are Welch's own.

The album was reissued as a 2-for-1 CD (the second half being the songs from the follow-up album Man Overboard) by Edsel Records in 1998. Although it is not currently in print, it was made available for download on iTunes in 2008.

Track listing
All songs written by Bob Welch, except as indicated.

 "Rebel Rouser" – 4:37
 "Love Came 2X" (Donny Francisco, Todd Sharp, Brad Palmer, David Adelstein) – 4:47 
 "Watch the Animals" – 4:05
 "Straight Up" – 3:02
 "Hideaway" (Sharp) – 2:30 
 "Future Games" – 3:28
 "Oneonone" – 2:52
 "Don't Let Me Fall" (Adelstein) – 3:20 
 "Spanish Dancers" – 5:01
 "Old Man of 17" – 4:07

Personnel

Musicians
 Bob Welch – vocals, lead guitar
 Todd Sharp – guitar
 Brad Palmer – bass guitar, vocals
 David Adelstein – keyboards, vocals
 Donny Francisco – drums, percussion, vocals
 Roger Voudouris – acoustic guitar on "Oneonone"

Technical
 John Carter – producer
 David Cole – engineer
 Randy Ezratty – engineer
 Liz Sowers – photography

References

1979 albums
Bob Welch (musician) albums
Capitol Records albums
Albums recorded at Capitol Studios